is a Japanese professional shogi player ranked 7-dan.

Promotion history
The promotion history for Murata is as follows:
 6-kyū: 1993
 1-dan: 1996
 4-dan: October 1, 2001
 5-dan: June 19. 2007
 6-dan: October 23, 2008
 7-dan: December 18, 2019

References

External links
ShogiHub: Professional Player Info · Murata, Tomohiro

Japanese shogi players
Living people
Professional shogi players
Professional shogi players from Hyōgo Prefecture
1981 births
People from Takasago, Hyōgo